Benjamin Simonds (12 February 1725/6-11 April 1807) was a militia commander of Massachusetts during the French and Indian War and the American Revolutionary War.  He was colonel of the all-Berkshire regiment of about five hundred men known as the “Berkshire Boys” during the American Revolutionary War. His regiment notably fought in the Battle of Bennington in the summer of 1777.  Simonds died in 1807 and was buried in what is now known as West Cemetery in Williamstown, Massachusetts.

Early life 
Benjamin Simonds was born on 12 February 1725/6 in Killingly, New London County (later Windham County), Connecticut, the son of Joseph and Rachel Simonds and was baptized at the First Congregational Church of Killingly, now the First Congregational Church of Putnam, CT on 6 March 1725/6.  His father Joseph Simonds, born in what is now Lexington, Middlesex County, Massachusetts, 8 June 1689, was a cordwainer (i.e. shoemaker) who married his first wife Rachel (maiden name unknown) by 6 July 1714 when a daughter was born to them in Chelmsford, Middlesex County, Massachusetts. He was one of the first settlers of Londonderry, New Hampshire in 1719 but by 1723 had moved to Killingly, New London County (later Windham County), Connecticut where Benjamin Simonds was born. Benjamin's mother Rachel died between October 1728 when her youngest son James Simonds was born and 7 September 1729 when Joseph Simonds was admitted with his second wife Mary (maiden name unknown) to the Congregational Church of Killingly, Connecticut. Joseph Simonds married 3rdly at Killingly, 17 November 1738, Hannah Abbe, daughter of Obadiah and Elizabeth (Wilkinson) Abbe. Joseph Simonds remained in Killingly until about 1741 when he moved with his family to Ware, Massachusetts.

Early military career 

Benjamin Simonds’s military career began during the war called King George's War which started in 1744.  At the start of the war, Governor William Shirley of Massachusetts ordered that a line of forts be built from Colrain to the Dutch settlements,  the strongest and westernmost of which was called Fort Massachusetts. Begun in the summer of 1745 in East Hoosac or what is now Williamstown, Massachusetts, Fort Massachusetts was garrisoned by December of that year and Benjamin Simonds was at that time or the following year a part of that garrison.  On August 19, 1746, Fort Massachusetts was attacked by an army of French soldiers and their Indian allies and surrendered the following day because only eight of the garrison of twenty two men were in reasonable health, the remainder being sick. The French and Indians then took the members of the garrison captive to Fort Saint-Frédéric on Lake Champlain (modern day Crown Point, New York) then to Montreal on September 10 before reaching Quebec on September 15, 1746. On the first night after their capture, the party camped near the river at the spot where Simonds would eventually buy and build a house. The site is now known as the “River Bend Farm”. The journey to Quebec was later described by the fort’s chaplain, Rev. John Norris, and he mentions Benjamin Simonds, or “Brother Simon” as he called him, at several points in his narrative. Norton reported for August 22 that “the Indians also carry’d in their Canoes Br Simon & John Aldrich, and Perry’s Wife, down the River about ten Miles.” For August 23 he reported that “the French still carrying Smeed’s and Scot’s Wives and Children, the Indians finding Horses for Brothers Simon and John Aldrich.”   According to Nehemiah How who wrote another captivity narrative, Benjamin Simonds was one of the captives from Fort Massachusetts who arrived at the prison in Quebec on September 15, 1746.  Only nine of the soldiers captured at Fort Massachusetts returned home and Benjamin Simonds and John Aldrich, both sick in the hospital at Quebec, were the last to return in October 1747. According to his petition dated 12 December 1749, Benjamin Simonds, after his return from captivity, was “unable to Get Home till 14 days after, and was weak & low and unable for a whole month to provide for himself.” He was awarded £20, 9s. for his service. During the Seven Years' War, Benjamin Simonds was again stationed at Fort Massachusetts where he was listed serving as a private in a company commanded by Capt. Ephraim Williams from 14 October 1754 to 28 March 1755 and then again in a company commanded by Isaac Wyman from 29 March 1755 to 26 November 1755.

Revolutionary War 
Benjamin Simonds is most known for his leadership in the American Revolutionary War. On a list of officers commissioned 30 August 1775, Benjamin Simonds was commissioned Colonel of the 2nd Berkshire County Regiment of Massachusetts Militia, while Mark Hopkins was commissioned Colonel of the 1st Berkshire County Regiment.  On 22 January 1776, an act was passed by the Massachusetts legislature for "Forming and Regulating the Militia within the Colony of the Massachusetts Bay, in New England, etc." and repealing all former acts for that purpose. John Hancock, Azor Orne, and Benjamin Lincoln were chosen 1st, 2nd and 3rd Major Generals of the Massachusetts militia, dated 8 February 1776. Brigadiers for the various counties were chosen and the total number of regiments was set for each county, Berkshire County to have 2 regiments. The Brigadier General chosen on 30 January 1776 for Berkshire County was John Fellows, the appointment being concurred in by Council, 8 February 1776. According to an official record of a ballot of the Massachusetts House of Representative dated 30 January 1776, officers were again chosen for the Berkshire County Regiment of Massachusetts Militia (the appointments concurred in by Council, 7 February 1776), with Benjamin Simonds again being chosen Colonel of the 2nd Berkshire County Regiment and Mark Hopkins Colonel of the 1st Berkshire County Regiment. 

It is reported that Col. Benjamin Simonds and his regiment fought at the Battle of White Plains on 28 October 1776. However, they fought in a losing battle. The regiment was then stationed at Fort Ticonderoga from December 16, 1776 to March 22, 1777. On the 13th August 1777, he met with Gen. John Stark and Col. Seth Warner in a council of war at the so called Catamount Tavern before the Battle of Bennington and commanded his Berkshire regiment in that engagement. He was a Colonel until 1780.

Family 
On 23 April 1752, Benjamin Simonds was married by Joseph Hawley in Northampton, Massachusetts to Mary Davis who was born 12 November 1730 in Brookfield, Massachusetts, daughter of Joseph Davis, Sr. and Experience Willis. Mary (Davis) Simonds appears to have had a difficult childhood. Her father, Joseph Davis Sr., died in 1732 when she was only about two and her brother, Joseph Davis, Jr. was five. Her mother married 2ndly in Brookfield to John Hulbert who died four years later, 10 January 1736/7 in Northampton, Massachusetts. She then married 3rdly to Joseph Burt of Northampton and died shortly after on 29 February 1739/40. In his will dated 26 February 1757, Joseph Burt gave "to Joseph Davis and to Mary Symonds, the children of my wife deceased, one-quarter part of my estate...in equal proportion." Benjamin and Mary (Davis) Simonds had seven daughters and three sons, all born in Williamstown, Massachusetts:
Rachel Simonds, born 8 April 1753 and died at Williamstown, MA, 29 November 1802; married firstly, Thomas Train and 2ndly, Benjamin Skinner, son of Rev. Thomas Skinner of Colchester, Connecticut.
Justin Simonds, born 12 February 1755; died young.
Sarah Simonds, born 8 July 1757, married 13 July 1775, Ithamar Clark, Jr., son of Ithamar Clark, Sr. of Northampton, MA by his third wife Sarah (Janes) Parsons.
Marcy Simonds, born 2 December 1759, died in Middle Granville, NY, 15 April 1834, married ca. 1775, Charles Kellogg, son of Charles Kellogg of Bolton, CT.
Joseph Simonds, born 8 April 1762 and died 16 July 1838 in Charlotte, Chittenden County, Vermont; the name of his first wife who was the mother of his five children is unknown; he married 2ndly, 6 May 1825 in Monkton, VT, Lucy Terrill, daughter of Stephen and Hepzibah (Griffith) Terrill and widow of Ephraim Bates. 
Prudence Simonds, born 4 December 1763 and died 23 August 1844; married Jonathan Bridges, son of Samuel and Anna (Foote) Bridges of Colchester, CT.
Ablina Simonds, born 8 October 1765 and died 29 March 1846 and is buried in Attica, NY; married 2 December 1784 in Williamstown, MA, Joseph Osborne.
Electa Simonds, born 19 January 1767 and died in Skaneateles, NY, 25 April 1841; married 21 October 1787 in Williamstown, MA, Thaddeus Edwards, son of Ebenezer and Lucy (Warner) Edwards of Northampton, MA.
Polly Simonds, born 1771, married Perley Putnam, son of Asa Putnam and Anna (Collins) Putnam, the 2nd wife of Col. Benjamin Simonds.
Benjamin Simonds, born 1773 and died 16 June 1786 in Williamstown, MA.
Mary (Davis) Simonds died at Williamstown, 7 June 1798, and Benjamin Simonds married secondly, 4 November 1798, Mrs. Anna (Collins) Putnam, born at Brimfield, Massachusetts, 25 February 1746/7, and died at Williamstown, 3 April 1807, daughter of Nathan and Phebe (Weld) Collins of Brimfield, and widow of Asa Putnam.

Later years 
Many years later, trustees requested that Simonds join the committee to build “West College”, in accordance with Colonel Ephraim Williams’ will.  It was finished in 1791 and was named the “Free School”, until 1793 when Williams College officially received its charter.

References
 

1726 births
1807 deaths